Yamao is a Japanese surname. Notable people with the surname include:

, Japanese rhythmic gymnast
, Japanese cyclist
, Japanese footballer
, Japanese poet
, Japanese politician
, Japanese samurai

Japanese-language surnames